Oleksandr Semenovych Zelenskyy (born 23 December 1947), also known as Aleksandr Semyonovich Zelensky, is a Ukrainian mining scientist and mathematician who specializes in the automation of geological and surveying support. He is a professor and a doctor of technical sciences. Zelenskyy has been the head of the Kryvyi Rih State University's Department of Cybernetics and Computing Hardware since 1995. He is the father of Ukrainian president Volodymyr Zelenskyy.

Early life and family 
Oleksandr Semenovych Zelenskyy was born in Kryvyi Rih, Soviet Ukraine, on 23 December 1947. He is of Jewish origin. His father, Semyon (Simon) Ivanovych Zelenskyy, served in the Red Army's 57th Guards Motor Rifle Division during World War II. Semyon's father and three brothers were killed in the Holocaust. He is married to Rymma Zelenska (born 16 September 1950). He is the father of Ukrainian President Volodymyr Zelenskyy (born 1978).

Academic career 
Oleksandr Zelenskyy earned his bachelor's degree in electrical engineering from Kryvyi Rih State University in 1972. In 1983, he defended his dissertation at the Moscow State Mining University, titled "Automated calculation of iron ore reserves in the ICS quarry." Zelenskyy has been the head of the Kryvyi Rih State University's Department of Cybernetics and Computing Hardware since 1995. Alexander Zelensky has always put his scientific work into practice. Their logical continuation and development was the creation of an automated mining management system at the joint Mongolian-Russian enterprise ERDENET, which develops one of the world's largest copper-molybdenum deposits. He worked with this plant for more than 20 years.

References 

1947 births
People from Kryvyi Rih
Kryvyi Rih National University alumni
Jewish Ukrainian scientists
20th-century Ukrainian scientists
21st-century Ukrainian scientists
Living people
20th-century Ukrainian Jews
Family of Volodymyr Zelenskyy